The 2009–10 Welsh Football League Division Three began on 15 August 2009 and ended on 22 May 2010. Aberbargoed Buds won the league by one point.

Team changes from 2008–09
Abertillery Bluebirds were promoted from the Gwent County League and Corus Steel were promoted from the South Wales Amateur League. Briton Ferry Athletic and Llansawel merged to form Briton Ferry Lansawel. South Gower applied to join the league and were accepted replacing Llansawel.

Ystradgynlais were relegated to the Neath & District League and Merthyr Saints were relegated to the South Wales Amateur League.

AFC Llwydcoed, AFC Porth and Porthcawl Town were promoted to the Welsh Football League Division Two.

Pentwyn Dynamos, Garw and Pontypridd Town were relegated from the Welsh Football League Division Two.

League table

Results

References

External links
 Welsh Football League

Welsh Football League Division Three seasons
4